The 1920–21 Kentucky Wildcats men's basketball team competed on behalf of the University of Kentucky during the 1920–21 season. Basil Hayden starred for Kentucky.

References

Kentucky Wildcats men's basketball seasons
Kentucky
1920 in sports in Kentucky
1921 in sports in Kentucky